Truants (Apontes) is a Greek film directed by Nikos Grammatikos. The film released in 1996 and it stars Nikos Georgakis, Giorgos Evgenikos, Vangelis Mourikis, Tasos Nousias, Costas Staridas and Aimilios Cheilakis. The film is also known with the English title The Absent Ones or the French title Truants. It won the best film award both the Greek State Film Awards and the Greek Film Critics Association Awards.

Plot
Six old schoolfriends meet every summer in Salamina, the place where they grew up. Year after year they change and mature and the youthful dreams are replaced by reality. Αs they grow up, their once-solid friendship inevitably fades. Finally, they follow different paths and gradually become like strangers. One member doesn't stand the situation and commits suicide.

Cast
Nikos Georgakis as Andreas
Yorgos Evgenikos as Manolis
Vangelis Mourikis as Sakis
Tasos Nousias as Giannis
Kostas Staridas as Nikos 
Emilios Chilakis as Antonis

Awards

References

External links

Greek drama films
1996 films